The 2016 FIBA Americas Under-18 Championship for Women was an international basketball competition that took place in Valdivia, Chile from July 13–17, 2016. It was the eleventh edition of the championship, and was the FIBA Americas qualifying tournament for the 2017 FIBA Under-19 World Championship for Women. Eight national teams from across the Americas, composed of women aged 19 and under, competed in the tournament. The United States won their eighth consecutive gold in this event by beating Canada in the final, 109–62.

Participating teams
 North America:
 
 
 Central America:
 
 
 
 South America:
 
 
  (hosts)

Preliminary round
The draw was held on 14 April 2016.

All times are local (UTC-4).

Group A

Group B

Classification round
All times are local (UTC-4).

Classification 5–8

Seventh place game

Fifth place game

Final round
All times are local (UTC-4).

Semifinals

Third place game

Final

Awards

Final ranking 

* Brazil qualified for the tournament but was suspended by FIBA. A fourth team from FIBA Americas had to be named to take Brazil's place. The draw took place with the fourth FIBA Americas team's identity yet to be named. On 12 May 2017, Mexico was chosen to replace Brazil.

References

External links
FIBA

FIBA Americas Under-18 Championship for Women
2016 in women's basketball
2016–17 in North American basketball
2016–17 in South American basketball
International women's basketball competitions hosted by Chile
July 2016 sports events in South America
FIBA